Jon Errasti Zabaleta (born 6 June 1988) is a Spanish retired professional footballer who plays as a defensive midfielder.

Club career
Born in Eibar, Gipuzkoa, Errasti played youth football with Basque Country neighbours Real Sociedad. He made his senior debut in the 2007–08 season with the reserves, in the Segunda División B.

In late June 2012, Errasti signed with local SD Eibar also in the third tier. In his first season he was an undisputed first choice, totalling nearly 4,000 minutes of action in all competitions as his team finally achieved promotion in the playoffs.

On 28 September 2013, Errasti made his Segunda División debut when he started in a 3–2 away loss against Sporting de Gijón. He contributed 32 appearances in 2013–14, as the Armeros were promoted to La Liga for the first time ever.

Errasti made his debut in the Spanish top flight on 24 August 2014, in the 1–0 home win over his former club. Roughly a year later, he moved abroad for the first time in his career, joining Italian Serie B side Spezia Calcio.

On 11 July 2017, Errasti returned to Spain and its second division after agreeing to a two-year deal at AD Alcorcón. On 29 January 2019, after being rarely used during the campaign, he terminated his contract.

Errasti signed with Polish II liga team Elana Toruń on 15 March 2019. He returned to his home country in July, joining third-tier UD Logroñés.

References

External links

1988 births
Living people
Spanish footballers
Footballers from Eibar
Association football midfielders
La Liga players
Segunda División players
Segunda División B players
Tercera División players
Real Sociedad B footballers
SD Eibar footballers
AD Alcorcón footballers
UD Logroñés players
Serie B players
Spezia Calcio players
II liga players
Elana Toruń players
Spanish expatriate footballers
Expatriate footballers in Italy
Expatriate footballers in Poland
Spanish expatriate sportspeople in Italy
Spanish expatriate sportspeople in Poland